Ion Cărăruș is a Moldovan professional footballer who plays as a midfielder for CSC 1599 Șelimbăr.

Football career
Cărăruș made his professional debut for Zimbru in the Divizia Națională on 11 September 2016 against Zaria Bălți.

References

External links
   
 Cărăruș at sports.md

Notes

1996 births
Living people
Footballers from Chișinău
Moldovan footballers
Association football midfielders
Moldova youth international footballers
Moldova under-21 international footballers
S.C. Braga players
Moldovan Super Liga players
Liga II players
U.D. Leiria players
FC Zimbru Chișinău players
CSF Bălți players
CS Știința Miroslava players
Härnösands FF players
FCV Farul Constanța players
FC Unirea Constanța players
CSC 1599 Șelimbăr players
Moldovan expatriate footballers
Moldovan expatriate sportspeople in Portugal
Expatriate footballers in Portugal
Moldovan expatriate sportspeople in Romania
Expatriate footballers in Romania
Moldovan expatriate sportspeople in Sweden
Expatriate footballers in Sweden